The Mar del Plata Naval Base is a naval port facility of the Argentine Navy, situated in Mar del Plata in the province of Buenos Aires and home to the Argentine submarine fleet.

Based ships

Corvettes 

 ARA Drummond (P-31)
 ARA Guerrico (P-32)
 ARA Granville (P-33)
 ARA Bouchard (P-51)
 ARA Piedrabuena (P-52)
 ARA Almirante Storni (P-53)

Hydrographic division 
 ARA Puerto Deseado (Q-20)
 ARA Comodoro Rivadavia (Q-11)

Submarine fleet 

 ARA Santa Cruz (S-41)
 ARA Salta (S-31)

Auxiliaries and research 
 ARA Bahía Agradable (A-23)
 ARA Chulupí (R-10)
 ARA Chiquiyán (R-18)
 ARA Suboficial Castillo (A-6)

See also
 Port Belgrano Naval Base
Ushuaia Naval Base
Falklands Naval Station

References

Argentine Navy bases
Buildings and structures in Mar del Plata